John Peter "Jack" Heinzman (September 27, 1863 – November 10, 1914) was a professional baseball player. His playing career spanned four seasons, including one where he played one game in Major League Baseball.

Professional career
Heinzman began his professional career in 1884 with the Harrisburg Olympics of the Eastern League. The next season, Heinzman played for the Macon, Georgia baseball club in the Southern League. In 1886, Heinzman played for the Macon club, the Class-B Chattanooga Lookouts, and the major league Louisville Colonels. In the minors that season, Heinzman batted a combined .240 with 12 doubles in 59 games. In the majors, Heinzman didn't get a hit in 5 at-bats with 1 run. Heinzman's last season in pro-baseball was 1889 with the Evansville Hoosiers of the Central Interstate League.

Death
On November 10, 1914, Heinzman died in Louisville, Kentucky, and he was laid to rest at Saint Louis Cemetery in Louisville.

References

External links

1863 births
1914 deaths
Louisville Colonels players
Baseball players from Indiana
Major League Baseball first basemen
Harrisburg Olympics players
Macon (minor league baseball) players
Chattanooga Lookouts players
Evansville Hoosiers players
Charleston (minor league baseball) players
Atlanta (minor league baseball) players
People from New Albany, Indiana
Burials at St. Louis Cemetery, Louisville